Alton is an unincorporated community on the Buckhannon River in Upshur County, West Virginia, United States.

Alton is located at the junction of County Routes 32 and 11/9. The community was originally known as Pringles Mill after the local Pringle family, descendants of John and Samuel Pringle. The Pringle brothers became popular in West Virginia folklore when they took up residence in a sycamore tree and lived there until the fall of 1767, when John went back to the South Branch Potomac River valley and learned that the French and Indian War was over and that they were no longer wanted as deserters.

Unincorporated communities in Upshur County, West Virginia
Unincorporated communities in West Virginia